Anthimus VII or Anthimos VII Tsatsos, (1827, Filiates – 19 December 1913) was the Ecumenical Patriarch of Constantinople from 1895 to 1896. He died in Halki, Turkey.

In 1895, he criticized the encyclical Praeclara gratulationis publicae of Pope Leo XIII.

1835 births
1913 deaths
People from Filiates
19th-century Ecumenical Patriarchs of Constantinople